The Sekiya Kinen (Japanese 関屋記念) is a Grade 3 horse race for Thoroughbreds aged three and over, run in August over a distance of 1600 metres on turf at Niigata Racecourse.

The Sekiya Kinen was first run in 1966 and has held Grade 3 status since 1984. The race distance was 2000 metres before being reduced to 1800 metres in 1970 and to 1600 metres in 1975. The race was run twice at Fukushima Racecourse, over 1200 metres in 1988 and 1700 metres in 2000.

Winners since 2000

Earlier winners

 1984 - Hayate Mig
 1985 - Takara Steel
 1986 - Island Goddess
 1987 - Cool Heart
 1988 - Hishino Lypheor
 1989 - Mr Brandy
 1990 - Makiba Cyclone
 1991 - Nifty Niece
 1992 - Sprite Passer
 1993 - Meiteringer
 1994 - My Superman
 1995 - Festive King
 1996 - Eishin Guymon
 1997 - Eishin Guymon
 1998 - Daiwa Texas
 1999 - Reward Ninfa

See also
 Horse racing in Japan
 List of Japanese flat horse races

References

Turf races in Japan